Jeff Stevens may refer to:

 Jeff Stevens (baseball) (born 1983), American baseball pitcher
 Jeff Stevens (singer) (born 1959), American country music singer, songwriter and record producer